Jacek Kamil Krzynówek (born 15 May 1976) is a former Polish footballer.

He is regarded as one of the best Polish footballers. He has earned many awards and trophies, not only in Poland, but also abroad. He has earned the honour of twice being named the Polish Footballer of the Year by magazine Pilka Nozna in 2003 and 2004. He has appeared in 96 international matches for Poland, scoring 15 goals. He is also a member of the Elite Polish National Team Footballers by the PZPN.

One of his career highlights of his career was scoring a highly acclaimed goal against Real Madrid in the 2004–05 UEFA Champions League.

Career

Early career
Krzynówek's football career started with LZS Chrzanowice. In 1994 he joined RKS Radomsko where he played two seasons and then moved to another Polish club, Raków Częstochowa, in which he made his debut on 28 July 1996 in the Polish Ekstraklasa.

After a season with Raków, he moved to second division club, GKS Bełchatów. In the 1997–98 season, he with his team advanced to the Ekstraklasa. His club was unable to keep itself in the top division, and was relegated back to the second division. Despite this, his skills and play impressed scouts from other clubs, including 1. FC Nürnberg, as well as the coach of the Polish national team, Janusz Wójcik.

International career and Bundesliga
Whilst still a player for GKS Bełchatów, he made his debut for the 
Polish national team on 10 November 1998  against Slovakia in a 3–1 Poland win. In 1999, he moved to 1. FC Nürnberg in the 2. Bundesliga. He made his return to the national team in the beginning of 2000, after Jerzy Engel became coach. Very shortly, he became one of the most important players in the team that qualified for the 2002 FIFA World Cup.

In 2002, he contributed to the promotion of 1. FC Nürnberg to the Bundesliga, and was named the best left midfielder in the 2. Bundesliga. Also in 2002, he went to South Korea and Japan for the 2002 World Cup with Poland. Despite a poor performance by Poland, he was praised for his play, and appeared in all three matches.

He missed most of the 2002–03 season due to injury. In the fall of 2003, he played in crucial UEFA Euro 2004 qualifying matches for Poland. Poland failed to qualify and 1. FC Nürnberg was unable to avoid relegation from the Bundesliga.

As a result of his performances, he was transferred to Bundesliga club Bayer Leverkusen. In the 2004–05 season, he was one of Leverkusen’s best players, and the trio of Krzynowek, Andriy Voronin and Dimitar Berbatov drew the attention of many top European sides. Bayer Leverkusen also performed well in the Champions League, defeating both Real Madrid and A.S. Roma in the group stage, but were eliminated by eventual champions Liverpool F.C. in the round of 16. Krzynówek scored three goals, one of which was a long shot versus Real Madrid.

In August 2005, he was part of the national team's triumphant performance at the Valeri Lobanovsky Memorial Tournament 2005. During 2006 FIFA World Cup qualification, he played in the most important games for Poland and contributed to Poland's qualification to the 2006 FIFA World Cup in Germany. As a result of another injury during the spring of 2006, he was unable to play regularly at his club, Bayer Leverkusen. This was evident in his poor form during the 2006 FIFA World Cup and was one of the poorest performers in the Polish team as they lost 2–0 to the surprising Ecuador and 1–0 to hosts Germany. After a disappointing 2005–06 season, he moved to VfL Wolfsburg.

Krzynówek was a key player in the UEFA Euro 2008 qualifying campaign for Poland where he scored four goals; three against Azerbaijan and an astonishing equalizer in the 87th minute against Portugal. His left-foot strike from 40 yards hit the post and the back of Portuguese keeper Ricardo before squeezing into the back of the net. Thanks to a very successful all around performance he was then picked into Eurosport's dream team as the left midfielder and Poland's squad for UEFA Euro 2008 where the Poles competed for the first time in their history.

On 17 November 2007, Wisła Kraków announced that they were interested in purchasing Krzynówek during the Ekstraklasa transfer window, but after negotiations the Polish club could not agree to terms with VfL Wolfsburg.

On 2 February 2009, Krzynówek moved to Hannover 96 where he stayed until the summer of 2010.

Retirement and post-retirement
On 15 August 2011, Krzynówek officially announced his retirement after 178 matches in the German top-flight.

Between 1 July 2015 and 31 May 2016 he was the sporting director at GKS Bełchatów.

International goals
Source:

References

External links
 Official site of Jacek Krzynówek 
 
 
 
 
 Leverkusen-who's who 

Living people
1976 births
People from Radomsko County
Sportspeople from Łódź Voivodeship
Association football midfielders
Polish footballers
GKS Bełchatów players
1. FC Nürnberg players
Bayer 04 Leverkusen players
VfL Wolfsburg players
Hannover 96 players
RKS Radomsko players
Bundesliga players
2. Bundesliga players
Expatriate footballers in Germany
Poland international footballers
2002 FIFA World Cup players
2006 FIFA World Cup players
Polish expatriate footballers
UEFA Euro 2008 players
Ekstraklasa players
Raków Częstochowa players